Stay Tuned for Danger is the second installment in the Nancy Drew point-and-click adventure game series by Her Interactive. It was officially discontinued in 2011 before re-releasing in 2016 after the company had transferred to their new gaming system. It had an ESRB rating of E for moments of mild violence and peril. Players took on the first-person view of fictional amateur sleuth Nancy Drew and solved the mystery through interrogation of suspects, solving puzzles, and discovering clues. It featured longer game play and improved graphics compared to the previous game, Nancy Drew: Secrets Can Kill. It was also the first one in the series to feature three-dimensional suspects. There were three levels of gameplay: Junior, Senior, and Master detective modes. Each mode offered a different difficulty level of puzzles and hints, but none of these changes affected the actual plot of the game. It was loosely based on a book of the same name, Stay Tuned for Danger (1987).

Plot
Nancy Drew is invited to New York City to stay with Mattie Jensen, a popular soap opera star. Mattie wants Nancy to investigate the death threats that her co-star, Rick Arlen, has been receiving. Throughout the game, Nancy discovers each character has a motive for threatening Rick:

Millie Strathorn who sometimes confuses reality and fiction, believed that everything happening on the show was real. Because she hated Rick's character, she hated him, so she submitted story-lines that killed him off to the show's writers. However, they never included any of her stories in it.
Mattie Jensen used to date Rick, but he dumped her in order to date Lillian. She then went on to date her agent, Dwayne Powers. 
Lillian Weiss dated Rick for a short period of time. She felt that he was only using her to advance his career, so she sent some bitter threats to him, including poisoned chocolates and an angry love poem. However, when he started to receive additional threats, she began to investigate. 
William Pappas was afraid that Rick leaving the show would cause low ratings and potential cancellation. He was also furious that Rick reneged on his contract.
Dwayne Powers was jealous of Rick's success as an actor and the fact that Mattie still cared for him.
Rick Arlen wanted to move out to Hollywood to pursue work in films, but because of his reputation with the ladies and his disloyalty with his contract, he was causing people to gossip.

Development
Toledo Blade reported that the game was in development in an issue released on April 3, 1999.

Characters
Nancy Drew - Nancy is an 18-year-old amateur detective from the fictional town of River Heights in the United States. She is the only playable character in the game, which means the player must solve the mystery from her perspective.
Mattie Jensen - A soap opera star who's currently renting out Aunt Eloise's apartment. She works at Worldwide Broadcasting Studios with co-star, Rick Arlen. Her agent is Dwayne Powers. She says that she and Rick used to date.
Rick Arlen - He is Mattie Jensen's co-star on Light of Our Love. Rick is breaking his contract in order to transfer to films. He's an infamous skirt-chaser and has quite a few broken hearts in his wake. He has been getting numerous death threats, notes, poisoned chocolates, dead flowers, bombs, and a broken watch, but is he just trying to get more attention?
Dwayne Powers - Dwayne is a failed actor who knew Mattie and Rick from their early days of summer stock theater. He's now a talent agent who seems knowledgeable in acting and stagecraft. Is he jealous of Rick's success and seeking revenge on the set?
Millie Strathorn - Millie is an eccentric old lady that is the owner and prop room master of World Wide Broadcasting. She also has trouble distinguishing reality from fiction. She has been trying to write Rick's character out of the show for quite some time. Is she trying to write him out permanently?
Lillian Weiss - The cranky director of Light of Our Love. She is one of the hearts that Rick has broken, and she seems very angry about it. Is she making sure he doesn't ever cross her again?
William "Bill" Pappas - Bill is the elderly producer for Light of Our Love and Rick broke a deal with him. Could he be sending the threats for revenge?
Owen W. Spayder - Owen is a mysterious stagehand that always seems to be onset when accidents and threats appear, yet you never are able to come face to face with him. He's recently been employed by the Dwayne Powers Agency.
Ralph Guardino - Ralph is the security guard for WWB.

Cast
Nancy Drew / Millie Strathorn - Lani Minella
Mattie Jensen - Moriah Seebold Angeline
Rick Arlen - Ryan Drummond
Dwayne Powers / Ralph Guardino - Bob Heath
Lillian Weiss - J'eral Fontaine
Owen W. Spayder - Roger Jensen
Ned Nickerson - Ryan Campbell
Bess Marvin - Katie Denny
George Fayne - Lindsey Newman
William Pappas - Frank Martin

Discontinuance
The game was officially discontinued on November 17, 2011 due to incompatibility issues with sound cards in newer computers. Although Her Interactive released a remastered version of its first game Nancy Drew: Secrets Can Kill, they have not announced plans to remaster any other older games, including Stay Tuned for Danger.

While not remastered, Her Interactive has made Stay Tuned for Danger available again by means of digital download only, along with some tips and tutorials for getting it to work with more modern Windows systems (7+). Installation of Stay Tuned for Danger - Win7+

Reception

During the year 2001, Stay Tuned for Danger sold 20,826 units in North America, according to PC Data. Its jewel case re-release sold 47,179 copies in the region during 2003. In the United States alone, the game's computer version sold between 100,000 and 300,000 units by August 2006. Combined sales of the Nancy Drew adventure game series reached 500,000 copies in North America by early 2003, and the computer entries reached 2.1 million sales in the United States alone by August 2006. Remarking upon this success, Edge called Nancy Drew a "powerful franchise".

New Straits Times wrote that while the game "had a certain voyeuristic charm", it "suffered from some of the most contrived puzzles ever put in an adventure game"

Stay Tuned for Danger received a "Gold" Parents' Choice Award in spring 2000.

Re-release
On August 8, 2016, Her Interactive re-released the game after transferring it to their new gaming platform.

References

External links
Official site (archived)

1999 video games
Detective video games
Video games based on Nancy Drew
Point-and-click adventure games
Video games developed in the United States
Video games scored by Kevin Manthei
Video games set in New York City
Windows games
Windows-only games
Her Interactive games
Single-player video games
North America-exclusive video games